Judo competitions at the 2019 Parapan American Games in Lima were held from August 24 to 25 at the VIDENA Sports Center 2.

Medal table

Medalists

Men's events

Women's events

References

External links
 
 Judo

2019 Parapan American Games
2019
American Games,Para